Harold Williams may refer to:

Arts and entertainment
 Harold Williams (baritone) (1893–1976), Australian singer
 Harold S. Williams (1898–1987), Australian author who lived in Japan
 Harold Ivory Williams (1949–2010), American jazz keyboardist, member of MFSB
 Hype Williams (Harold Williams, born 1970), American music video and film director
 H. R. Williams (Harold Ray Williams, fl. 2007–2011), American novelist

Religion
 Harold Williams (died 1954) (1864–1954), Welsh Archdeacon of Gower
 Harold Williams (priest) (1914–1990), Anglican Provost of Coventry
 Harold Ivory Williams (bishop) (1921–2014), American bishop

Others
 Harold Williams (linguist) (1876–1928), New Zealand journalist and polyglot
 Harold Herbert Williams (1880–1964), English scholar, expert on the works of Jonathan Swift
 Harold P. Williams (1882–1963), American attorney and judge
 Harold Williams (British Army officer) (1897–1971), British Army officer
 Harold Williams (footballer) (1924–2014), Welsh international footballer
 Harold M. Williams (1928–2017), chairman of U.S. Securities and Exchange Commission, 1977–1981
 Harold Williams (geologist) (1934–2010), Canadian geologist
 Harold Williams (cricketer) (born 1959), Grenadian cricketer

See also
 Harry Williams (disambiguation)